Strictly Come Dancing returned for its eleventh series beginning with a launch show on 7 September 2013, with the live shows starting on 27 and 28 September 2013. Sir Bruce Forsyth and Tess Daly returned to co-present the main show on BBC One, with Claudia Winkleman returning to present the results show alongside Daly. Zoe Ball returned as presenter of Strictly Come Dancing: It Takes Two on BBC Two. Len Goodman, Bruno Tonioli, Craig Revel Horwood and Darcey Bussell also returned as judges.

This was the first series to be made at Elstree Film and Television Studios in Elstree, Hertfordshire.  In March 2013, the show's former home at the BBC Television Centre in West London closed down for redevelopment. Strictly moved to Elstree for this series and settled into the vast George Lucas Stage 2 which had been recently refurbished.  The move to the Elstree location saw a complete overhaul of the look of the show, with a newly redesigned set, which would fit the much larger George Lucas Stage.

The shows on 5 October, 9 November and 7 December 2013 were hosted by Daly and Winkleman, with Forsyth taking time off. The show was broadcast live from Blackpool Tower Ballroom on 16 November 2013.

The series was won by Abbey Clancy and Aljaž Škorjanec on 21 December 2013. This series was notable as being Forsyth's last as main presenter and also for Brendan Cole becoming the first professional dancer to reach three separate finals.

Couples
On 1 June 2013, it was revealed that Flavia Cacace, Vincent Simone, Aliona Vilani and Erin Boag would be leaving the show. They would be replaced by four new professionals, Aljaž Škorjanec, Janette Manrara, Iveta Lukosiute and Emma Slater. However, on 22 August 2013 it was announced that Slater would move to the US version of the show Dancing with the Stars and that she would be replaced by Anya Garnis. It was also confirmed that Kevin Clifton would be joining the show, bringing the total number of couples to fifteen, one more than the fourteen competing in the previous year, meaning there were more female celebrities. On 2 September 2013 it was reported that professional dancer Natalie Lowe had injured her foot and would be replaced by Aliona Vilani who, however, was eliminated first.

The full line up was revealed on The One Show on 2 September 2013. The celebrities did not know their professional partners until they were introduced to each other on the launch show on 7 September 2013.

This was the first time ever in Strictly history where all the celebrities in the final were women.

Scoring chart

Average chart
This table only counts for dances scored on a traditional 40-point scale (the extra points from the Swing-a-Thon in week 11 are not included).

Highest and lowest scoring performances of the series 
The best and worst performances in each dance style according to the judges' 40-points scale are as follows:

 Vanessa Feltz and Ben Cohen are the only celebrities not to land on this list.

Couples' highest and lowest scoring dances

Weekly scores and songs

Unless indicated otherwise, individual judges scores in the charts below (given in parentheses) are listed in this order from left to right: Craig Revel Horwood, Darcey Bussell, Len Goodman, Bruno Tonioli.

Launch show
Musical guests: Rod Stewart—"Can't Stop Me Now", Jessie J—"It's My Party"

Week 1

Running order (Night 1 – Friday)

Running order (Night 2 – Saturday)

Week 2
 Musical guest: Matt Goss—"When Will I Be Famous?"
Running order

Judges' votes to save

Horwood: Julien & Janette
Bussell: Julien & Janette
Tonioli: Julien & Janette
Goodman: Did not vote, but would have voted to save Julien & Janette.

Week 3: Love Week
Musical guest: Andrea Bocelli—"When I Fall in Love"
Running order

Judges' votes to save

Horwood: Julien & Janette
Bussell: Julien & Janette
Tonioli: Julien & Janette
Goodman: Did not vote, but would have voted to save Julien & Janette.

Week 4
Musical guests: Andrea Begley—"Dancing in the Dark" and Keane—"Everybody's Changing"
Running order

Judges' votes to save

Horwood: Rachel & Pasha
Bussell: Rachel & Pasha
Tonioli: Rachel & Pasha
Goodman: Did not vote, but would have voted to save Rachel & Pasha.

Week 5
Musical guest: Earth, Wind and Fire—Medley of "Let's Groove"/"My Promise"/"Boogie Wonderland"
Running order

Judges' votes to save

Horwood: Patrick & Anya
Bussell: Patrick & Anya
Tonioli: Patrick & Anya
Goodman: Did not vote, but would have voted to save Patrick & Anya.

Week 6: Halloween Week
Musical guest: Madness—"La Luna"
Running order

Judges' votes to save

Horwood: Abbey & Aljaž
Bussell: Abbey & Aljaž
Tonioli: Abbey & Aljaž
Goodman: Did not vote, but would have voted to save Abbey & Aljaž.

Week 7
Musical guests: The Puppini Sisters—"Sing, Sing, Sing" and The Tenors—"Forever Young"
Running order

*Natalie fainted during dress rehearsals and therefore she and Artem were unable to perform on the live show, giving the couple a bye for the week.

Judges' votes to save

Horwood: Mark & Iveta
Bussell: Mark & Iveta
Tonioli: Mark & Iveta
Goodman: Did not vote, but would have voted to save Dave & Karen.

Week 8: Blackpool Week
Musical guests: André Rieu and JLS—"Billion Lights"
Running order

Judges' votes to save

Horwood: Fiona & Anton
Bussell: Mark & Iveta
Tonioli: Mark & Iveta
Goodman: Mark & Iveta

Week 9

Musical guest: Il Divo—"Tonight"
Running order

Judges' votes to save

Horwood: Ben & Kristina 
Bussell: Mark & Iveta
Tonioli: Mark & Iveta
Goodman: Mark & Iveta

Week 10: Musicals Week
Musical guest: Alfie Boe—"Bring Him Home"
Running order

Judges' votes to save
Horwood: Ashley & Ola
Bussell: Ashley & Ola
Tonioli: Ashley & Ola
Goodman: Did not vote, but would have voted to save Ashley & Ola.

Week 11: Quarter-Final
Musical guest: The Saturdays—"What About Us"
Running order

Judges' votes to save
Horwood: Patrick & Anya
Bussell: Patrick & Anya
Tonioli: Patrick & Anya
Goodman: Did not vote, but would have voted to save Ashley & Ola.

Week 12: Semi-Final
Musical guest: Celine Dion—"Breakaway"
Running order

Patrick and Anya chose to dance the Waltz in the Dance Off, while Natalie and Artem chose the Argentine Tango.

Judges' votes to save
Horwood: Natalie & Artem
Bussell: Natalie & Artem
Tonioli: Natalie & Artem
Goodman: Did not vote but would have voted to save Natalie & Artem.

Week 13: Final
Musical guest: Robbie Williams—"Puttin' On the Ritz"

Running order (Show 1)

Running order (Show 2)

Dance chart
 Highest scoring dance
 Lowest scoring dance
 Not performed due to illness

Week 1: Cha-Cha-Cha, Jive, Tango or Waltz
Week 2: One unlearned dance (introducing American Smooth, Charleston and Salsa)
Week 3 (Love Week): One unlearned dance (introducing Foxtrot, Paso Doble, Quickstep, Rumba, Samba and Viennese Waltz)
Weeks 4 & 5: One unlearned dance
Week 6 (Halloween Week): One unlearned dance
Week 7: One unlearned dance (introducing Argentine Tango)
Week 8 (Blackpool Week): One unlearned dance
Week 9: One unlearned dance
Week 10 (Musical Week): One unlearned dance
Week 11: One unlearned dance and Swing-a-Thon
Week 12: Two unlearned dances
Week 13 (Show 1): Judges' choice and showdance
Week 13 (Show 2): Couple's favourite dance of the series

Ratings
Weekly ratings for each show on BBC One. All numbers are in millions and provided by BARB.

References

External links
Official website

2013 British television seasons
Season 11
2013 in British television